Dobson is a ghost town in Rankin County, Mississippi, United States.

Dobson had a post office from 1886 to 1909.

R.M. "Uncle Dock" Gray of Dobson owned the first car in the community, a Maxwell touring car.

Dobson still had a voting precinct in 1984.

References

Former populated places in Rankin County, Mississippi
Former populated places in Mississippi